Lauri Läänemets (born 31 January 1983 in Tallinn) is an Estonian politician. He is currently Minister of Interior Affairs and was a member of XIV Riigikogu.

In 2007 he graduated from Tallinn University in recreation management.

From 2013 to 2017 he was mayor of the Väätsa Rural Municipality.

Since 2010, he has been a member of the Estonian Social Democratic Party.

Lauri Läänemets was elected chairman of the Social Democratic Party (SDE) on 5 February 2022 by party members at the General Assembly.

References

1983 births
Living people
Mayors of places in Estonia
Members of the Riigikogu, 2019–2023
Members of the Riigikogu, 2023–2027
Politicians from Tallinn
Social Democratic Party (Estonia) politicians
Tallinn University alumni